Luizão is a Portuguese nick-name. It may refer to:

 Luizão Maia (born 1949), Luiz de Oliveira da Costa Maia, Brazilian musician
 Luizão (footballer, born 1968), Luiz Antonio Ribeiro, Brazilian football midfielder
 Luizão Correa (born 1973), Brazilian beach volleyball player
 Luizão (footballer, born 1975), Luiz Carlos Bombonato Goulart, Brazilian football forward
 Luizão (footballer, born 1980), Osvaldo Luiz Pereira, Brazilian football defender
 Luizão (footballer, born 1987), Luiz Carlos Nascimento Júnior, Brazilian football defender
 Luizão (footballer, born 1988), Luiz Fernando dos Santos, Brazilian football striker
 Luizão (footballer, born 1990), Walter Luiz de Araújo, Brazilian football centre-back
 Luizão (footballer, born 1998), Luiz Gustavo Novaes Palhares, Brazilian football midfielder
 Luizão (footballer, born 2002), Luiz Gustavo Oliveira da Silva, Brazilian football defender
 Luizão (footballer, born 2003), Luiz Guilherme Vieira da Silva, Brazilian football forward

See also 
 Luisão (born 1981), Ânderson Luís da Silva, Brazilian football defender.

 Nicknames